Liam Hood (born 6 January 1992) is a Scotland international rugby league footballer who plays as a  for Wakefield Trinity in the Betfred Super League.

He previously played for the Leeds Rhinos in the Super League, and on loan from Leeds at the Dewsbury Rams in the Championship and the Hunslet Hawks in the Championship and Championship 1. Hood has also played for the Salford Red Devils in the Super League and the Swinton Lions, Leigh Centurions and the Widnes Vikings in the Betfred Championship.

Background
Hood was born in Bradford, West Yorkshire, England.

Career

Leeds Rhinos
Hood signed a professional contract with Leeds in 2009 and made his début in 2011 against Castleford scoring a controversial try that was given even though he was just short of the try line. Later on in the season he was loaned to Dewsbury where he made 12 appearances scoring twice. Between 2013 and 2014 he was on dual registration at Hunslet, making 34 appearances and scoring 17 tries. He left Leeds in 2014 after making 5 appearances and scoring three tries.

Salford Red Devils
Hood joined Salford for the 2016 season after being released by Leeds. He made 22 appearances scoring only once. He was one of many players to be released at the end of 2015.

Leigh Centurions
On 10 August 2020, it was confirmed that Hood had re-signed for Leigh.

Wakefield Trinity
On 17 August 2021, it was reported that he had signed for Wakefield Trinity in the Super League.

International career
Liam made his international début for Scotland in the 2012 European Cup.

In October and November 2015, Liam played for Scotland in the 2015 European Cup.

References

External links
Leigh Centurions profile
Leigh profile
Scotland profile
Scotland RL profile

1992 births
Living people
Dewsbury Rams players
English people of Scottish descent
English rugby league players
Hunslet R.L.F.C. players
Leeds Rhinos players
Leigh Leopards captains
Leigh Leopards players
Rugby league hookers
Rugby league players from Bradford
Salford Red Devils players
Scotland national rugby league team players
Swinton Lions players
Wakefield Trinity players